Germ cell tumor (GCT) is a neoplasm derived from germ cells. Germ-cell tumors can be cancerous or benign. Germ cells normally occur inside the gonads (ovary and testis).  GCTs that originate outside the gonads may be birth defects resulting from errors during development of the embryo.

Classification

GCTs are classified by their histology, regardless of location in the body. However, as more information about the genetics of these tumors become available, they may be classified based on specific gene mutations that characterize specific tumors. They are broadly divided in two classes:
 The germinomatous or seminomatous germ-cell tumors (GGCT, SGCT) include only germinoma and its synonyms dysgerminoma and seminoma.
 The nongerminomatous or nonseminomatous germ-cell tumors (NGGCT, NSGCT) include all other germ-cell tumors, pure and mixed.

The two classes reflect an important clinical difference. Compared with germinomatous tumors, nongerminomatous tumors tend to grow faster, have an earlier mean age at time of diagnosis (around 25 years versus 35 years, in the case of testicular cancers), and have a lower five-year survival rate.  The survival rate for germinomatous tumors is higher in part because these tumors are very sensitive to radiation, and they also respond well to chemotherapy.  The prognosis for nongerminomatous tumours has improved dramatically, however, due to the use of platinum-based chemotherapy regimens.

Germinomatous

Nongerminomatous

Mixed 

Mixed germ cell tumors occur in many forms.  Among these, a common form is teratoma with endodermal sinus tumor.

Teratocarcinoma refers to a germ cell tumor that is a mixture of teratoma with embryonal carcinoma, or with choriocarcinoma, or with both.  This kind of mixed germ cell tumor may be known simply as a teratoma with elements of embryonal carcinoma or choriocarcinoma, or simply by ignoring the teratoma component and referring only to its malignant component:  embryonal carcinoma and/or choriocarcinoma. They can present in the anterior mediastinum.

Cause

Some investigators suggest that this distribution arises as a consequence of abnormal migration of germ cells during embryogenesis. Others hypothesize a widespread distribution of germ cells to multiple sites during normal embryogenesis, with these cells conveying genetic information or providing regulatory functions at somatic sites.

Extragonadal GCTs were thought initially to be isolated metastases from an undetected primary tumor in a gonad, but many germ cell tumors are now known to be  congenital and originate outside the gonads.  The most notable of these is sacrococcygeal teratoma, the single most common tumor diagnosed in babies at birth.

Of all anterior mediastinal tumors, 15–20% are GCTs of which about 50% are benign teratomas. Ovarian teratomas may be associated with anti-NMDA receptor encephalitis.

Location

Despite their name, GCTs occur both within and outside the ovary and testis. They are found in:}
 head
 inside the cranium — pineal and suprasellar locations are most commonly reported
 inside the mouth — a fairly common location for teratoma
 neck
 mediastinum — account for 1% to 5% of all germ cell neoplasms 
 pelvis, particularly sacrococcygeal teratoma
In females, GCTs account for 30% of ovarian tumors, but only 1 to 3% of ovarian cancers in North America. In younger women, they are more common, thus in patients under the age of 21, 60% of ovarian tumors are of the germ-cell type, and up to one-third are malignant. In males, GCTs of the testis occur typically after puberty and are malignant (testicular cancer).  In neonates, infants, and children younger than 4 years, most are sacrococcygeal teratomas.

Males with Klinefelter syndrome have a 50 times greater risk of GSTs.  In these persons, GSTs usually contain nonseminomatous elements, present at an earlier age, and seldom are gonadal in location.

Treatment
Women with benign GCTs such as mature teratomas (dermoid cysts) are cured by ovarian cystectomy or oophorectomy. In general, all patients with malignant GCTs have the same staging surgery that is done for epithelial ovarian cancer. If the patient is in her reproductive years, an alternative is unilateral salpingoophorectomy, while the uterus, the ovary, and the fallopian tube on the opposite side can be left behind. This is not an option when the cancer is in both ovaries. If the patient has finished having children, the surgery involves complete staging, including salpingoophorectomy on both sides, as well as hysterectomy.

Patients with germ-cell cancer often need to be treated with combination chemotherapy for at least three cycles, but female patients with early-stage disease may not require this treatment. The chemotherapy regimen most commonly used in GCTs is called PEB (or BEP), and consists of bleomycin, etoposide, and a platinum-based antineoplastic (cisplatin). Targeted treatments, such as immunotherapy, hormonal therapy and kinase inhibitors, are being evaluated for tumors that do not respond to chemotherapy.

Prognosis

The 1997 International Germ Cell Consensus Classification is a tool for estimating the risk of relapse after treatment of malignant germ-cell tumor.

A small study of ovarian tumors in girls reports a correlation between cystic and benign tumors, and conversely, solid and malignant tumors.  Because the cystic extent of a tumor can be estimated by ultrasound, MRI, or CT scan before surgery, this permits selection of the most appropriate surgical plan to minimize risk of spillage of a malignant tumor.

Access to appropriate treatment has a large effect on outcome.  A 1993 study of outcomes in Scotland found that for 454 men with nonseminomatous (nongerminomatous) GCTs diagnosed between 1975 and 1989, five-year survival increased over time and with earlier diagnosis.  Adjusting for these and other factors, survival was 60% higher for men treated in a cancer unit that treated the majority of these men,  though the unit treated more men with the worst prognosis.

Choriocarcinoma of the testicles has the worst prognosis of all germ-cell cancers.

See also 
 Embryonic stem cells
 Cancer research

References

External links 

 humpath #2658 (Pathology images)
 Childhood Extracranial Germ Cell Tumors
 Extragonadal Germ Cell Tumors
 Ovarian Germ Cell Tumors
 
 Cancer.Net: Germ Cell Tumor

Gynaecological cancer
Colorectal surgery
Male genital neoplasia
Germ cell neoplasia